Wahlenbergia caryophylloides is a small herbaceous plant in the family Campanulaceae native to Western Australia.

It blooms between May and September producing white-blue-purple flowers.

The species is found on the edges of swamps, lagoons and mud flats in the Kimberley and Pilbara regions of Western Australia where it grows in sandy soils.

References

caryophylloides
Eudicots of Western Australia
Plants described in 1989
Endemic flora of Western Australia